is a Japanese manga series written by Kazuo Koike and illustrated by Ryoichi Ikegami. Crying Freeman follows a Japanese assassin hypnotized and trained by the Chinese mafia (called the "108 Dragons") to serve as its agent and covered in a vast and complex dragon tattoo. A quiet but complicated killer, Freeman reflexively sheds tears after every killing as a sign of regret.

The manga was originally serialized by Shogakukan on its magazine Big Comic Spirits from 1986 to 1988. It was first published in North America by Viz Media in comic book form. Viz later republished the series in graphic novel form in two versions: an initial set and longer volumes that combined the initial volumes together, dubbed "Perfect Collections." From 2006 to 2007, the manga was republished by Dark Horse Comics in five volumes.

The story was adapted into an anime OVA by Toei Animation, released from 1988 to 1994. Crying Freeman has also been adapted into three live-action films: two 1990 Hong Kong films in Cantonese (Killer's Romance and The Dragon from Russia) and a 1995 French-Canadian production in English.

Plot
Yō Hinomura, a Japanese potter, comes into the possession of some film showing an assassination by an agent of the 108 Dragons, a powerful Chinese mafia. Seeking its return, they kidnap him. Subjected to forced hypnosis, Yo is effectively brainwashed into acting as the 108 Dragons' principal assassin yet - cruelly - is permitted to remember his innocent past at the moment he kills, shedding a tear unconsciously each time that he does so. He is given the codename "Crying Freeman" as a result.

One of his killings is witnessed by Emu Hino, a lonely and beautiful Japanese artist. Knowing he must kill her; she paints his portrait and waits for him to come. When he does so, she tells him that she is tired of being alone and wishes to end her life. She asks for a favor before he kills her - to make love to her, so that she will not die as a virgin. He grants her wish but finds he cannot kill her and they fall in love. The killing she witnessed was of a yakuza boss, however, so the yakuza want to find her so that they can find the killer. One of the yakuza attempts to enter Emu's home and force her to disclose the name of the killer, critically injuring her. Freeman takes her to the hospital and tells her to meet him at Hinomura Kiln, where he intends to part with her. Instead, she accompanies him back to the 108 Dragons, where he tattoos her with tigers, and they marry.

The heads of the 108 Dragons decide to name Freeman as their heir. He is given the Chinese name Lóng Tài-Yáng, and Emu is renamed Hǔ Qīng-Lán, as both pass the tests given to them. It proves not as easy as that, however, as they must contend with challenges to the leadership from Bái-Yá Shàn, the granddaughter of the leaders of the 108 Dragons, and attempts to destroy the Dragons from other underground organizations.

Characters

108 Dragons
The  is a Chinese Mafia that rose to prominence in the 1970s. It holds numerous assets around the world, including its own nuclear submarine. As a rule in the organization, succession by blood inheritance is prohibited.

 /  / 

Portrayed by: Mark Dacascos
The son of a famous potter and a rising pottery star himself. During a visit to America to showcase his works, a photographer hid secret pictures of the 108 Dragons in one of his pots. Yo found the photos and was asked by the Dragons to surrender them but refused. As retribution, Father Dragon had him kidnapped and put under hypnosis, as he was considered the perfect candidate to lead the 108 Dragons.

Yo was then trained by Mother Tiger in assassination techniques and martial arts. After his training was complete, he received a giant dragon tattoo covering his body. Because he cries in remorse for his victims after he snaps out of his trance (it seems later to just become habit due to the fact that he willingly takes on missions), he earned the name Crying Freeman. As Freeman, Yo possesses incredible agility and strength, and is considered the strongest man in the world. Each of his senses have been honed and sharpened and he is able to adapt to any situation. Initially shown to use guns, he comes to prefer daggers, which he can proficiently wield with both his hands and feet.

In addition to being the strongest man in the world, Lóng Tài-Yáng is also one of the most handsome, and no woman has been able to resist his charms, which he takes full sexual advantage of even after Emu Hino becomes his wife.

 / 

Portrayed by: Julie Condra
A young artist whose father had died; Emu Hino was once a rich girl whose wealth disappeared with his death. All that was left to her was the old family mansion. One day, she witnesses Freeman chasing and killing a Japanese crime boss in Hong Kong, after which she asks his name, to which he only replied "Yo". When she sees his tears after the murder, she is intrigued and immediately falls in love with him.

Soon, she becomes witness to Freeman's murder of Shudo Shimazaki, the head of the Hakushin Society, which causes both the police and the Yakuza to tail her. She returns home only to find that Freeman is waiting for her. Emu then requests that Yo take her virginity before killing her, to which he complies. Later, Yo cannot bring himself to kill her as he has fallen in love with her, and the two eventually escape to Hong Kong. At first, Mother Tiger disapproves of her, thinking that Emu was weak, but Emu's strong will and resolve earns her the respect of the 108 Dragons. She is given the name Hǔ Qīng-Lán by Grandfather Dragon and is married to Freeman, who is renamed Lóng Tài-Yáng. Emu has a giant tiger tattooed on her back and two cubs on her torso for the children that she and Yo cannot have.

In the middle of the series, Emu gains possession of the legendary cursed katana Muramasa from an assassin who targets Freeman. She travels to the Kowloon Walled City to learn swordsmanship skills from an unlicensed dentist named Gouken Ishida. Despite being crafted during a time women were not allowed to wield swords, the Muramasa recognizes her as its true owner. As one of the leaders of the 108 Dragons, Emu is more resourceful and cleverer than even her husband, and as fearless as he is in the face of opposition. The first true owner of the Muramasa, she is quite dangerous as a sword master.

Also known as Mother Tiger, she is the former female head of the 108 Dragons. She took on the task of training Freeman, honing him into the best assassin in the world and the strongest man alive. Like Emu Hino, she has a Tiger tattooed on her body, which signifies her position in the 108 Dragons. She has adopted Freeman as a son and Emu as a daughter-in-law. While skeptical of Emu at first, she came to recognize her strength. Grandmother Tiger had a son in violation of the 108 Dragons' rule that the leaders are sterilized to prevent them from having children, as the organization survives on individual talent and not on heritage or legacies. Mother Tiger came to regret her decision as her son became a cold-blooded killer even in his early youth and was exiled to a remote island.

The granddaughter of Father Dragon and Mother Tiger who challenges Freeman for the leadership of the 108 Dragons shortly after his succession. She attempts a coup d'état immediately after Freeman and Emu's wedding, with the aid of Camorra and Elder Mercury, one of the Ten Planets who was loyal to her father. Bái-Yá Shàn is defeated by Freeman and subsequently forgiven and accepted back into the 108 Dragons, from then on becoming his faithful and devoted "little sister", acting as a personal maid and bodyguard for her older brother and his wife. A giant woman in both aspects of height and weight, Bái-Yá Shàn is practically invulnerable to most attacks, as she has survived multiple gunshot wounds. She often goes into missions naked, which is quite nauseating for her opponents. Her weapons of choice are two butterfly swords, but she also likes to keep an automatic rifle handy. Bái-Yá Shàn is very emotional, openly crying in moments of fear, doubt, and sorrow; at times, she still seems rather like a little girl despite her age.

 / 

Portrayed by: Byron Mann
A member of 108 Dragons and assistant to Freeman on his missions, who first worked with him after his kidnapping and hypnosis. After Freeman forces him to assist in helping save a critically wounded Emu Hino, he realizes that the two are meant for each other and defends Freeman's actions to Mother Tiger. After Freeman takes over leadership of the 108 Dragons, Huáng Dé-Yuán becomes his right-hand man. He dies from wounds sustained while fighting the Camorra assassin Kitche and is buried at sea after Freeman defeats her.

Hakushin Society

Portrayed by: Mako
Leader of the  Yakuza, which has a workforce of 26,000 men across Japan. His organization controls all aspects of organized crime except drug trafficking. Knowing that the 108 Dragons have sent Freeman to assassinate him in order to fully infiltrate Japan's criminal underground, Shimazaki goes to a police precinct for protection and to give vital information on the Chinese Mafia but is eventually shot in the head by a masked Freeman. Emu Hino is immediately marked as a witness when she immediately notices the tears flowing through Freeman's mask as he runs away.

Portrayed by: Masaya Kato
The second most powerful member of the Hakushin Society, he takes over the group after Shimazaki is assassinated by Freeman. Nicknamed , Ryuji attempts to kidnap Emu with the tacit support of the police. He is wounded by Freeman but survives and manages to see his face. Ryuji is later on assassinated by Freeman and Huang.

Portrayed by: Yoko Shimada
The wife of Ryuji Hanada and the most powerful woman in the Hakushin Society hierarchy. Following Ryuji's death, she ensnares Detective Nitta by managing to get compromising photos of them together taken, securing his cooperation in her scheme to locate Emu and avenge Ryuji's death, although she and Nitta quickly become lovers. Kimie and Nitta are stabbed in the chest by Freeman, but their lives are spared when Freeman forces them to accept his alibi that Yo Hinomura and Emu Hino committed suicide after killing Shimazaki over a past dispute. Later on, Kimie becomes a follower of Kumagaism and assists its leader Naiji Kumaga in his plot to seize control of the 108 Dragons by creating a clone of Freeman. Tasked by Kumaga to sleep with Freeman in order to learn his sexual habits and patterns to then pass them on to the clone, she subsequently falls in love with him and betrays Kumaga.

Portrayed by: Tchéky Karyo
A police detective assigned to interrogate Emu after identifying Freeman as "Yo" during his assassination of Shudo Shimazaki. He becomes romantically involved with Kimie Hanada after she blackmails him for his cooperation to locate Freeman and Emu. He and Kimie are forced by Freeman to tell the press of Yo Hinomura and Emu Hino's suicide in exchange for their lives. Later in the series, Nitta joins Kimie in becoming a follower of Kumagaism. When he learns that Kimie betrayed Kumaga by falling in love with Freeman, Nitta holds her hostage and demands for the 108 Dragons to send them back to Japan. His demands fall on deaf ears, as members of the 108 Dragons quickly subdue and kill him.

Camorra

With the aid of Bái-Yá Shàn and Elder Mercury, Don Carleone instigates a coup d'état to overthrow the 108 Dragons. When Don Carlone has his subordinates kill Elder Mercury and attempt to wipe out the entire hierarchy of the 108 Dragons, Freeman swiftly kills him, effectively crippling the Camorra.

A female assassin of the Camorra and Don Carleone's lover who has excellent marksmanship with a .223 Calico. Of African descent, she disguises herself as a blond-haired white woman and stabs a 108 Dragons subordinate to force him to leave a trail for her to follow all the way to Freeman. Wearing a special titanium body suit that blocks knife attacks and emits a 50,000-volt current that shocks anyone who attempts to stab her, Kitche severely wounds Huáng Dé-Yuán so he can lead her to Freeman. After killing Huáng, Kitche engages Freeman in a knife fight on the 108 Dragons' submarine, but when she lures him into the water and electrocutes him with her body suit, she realizes that Freeman has slit her wrist and the seawater is accelerating her blood loss. Freeman kisses Kitche before she dies and sinks to the bottom of the ocean.

Askari

Naming himself after an African god, Jigon is a master of an onzil called the "Bird's Head". After killing Jigon's right-hand-man Shikebaro, Freeman follows Shikebaro's mistress Miranda towards Jigon's hideout before he plants a foot knife on Jigon's head. Jigon pulls out the knife and kills Miranda with it before succumbing to his wound.

Jigon's second-in-command in the Askari Group. Highly skilled in using the chakram, Shikebaro has personally assassinated 30 European and African VIPs. Freeman proposes for the 108 Dragons to eliminate the Askari Group after thwarting an airliner hijacking by one of Shikebaro's henchmen, but the elders vote against him. After the Askari Group sends an assassin to wipe out the elders, Freeman follows the trail of the scent of Shikebaro's ambergris musk cologne and kills him outside his hotel.

 / 

The secret leader of the Askari group, Bugnug is an exotic and muscular African beauty specializing in the mambele. She controls the organization through her lieutenants Jigon and Shikebaro. After Freeman kills Jigon and Shikebaro, Bugnug launches a surprise attack on him. Despite losing a lot of blood, Freeman wins her over in the middle of the fight, resulting in a truce and halt to the fighting between the 108 Dragons and Askari. Bugnug saves Freeman's life through a blood transfusion, as they both share the same blood type. Bugnug falls in love with Freeman, who gives her the name "Dark Eyes", although she knows that he is already married. Since then, the Askari have been a valuable ally to the 108 Dragons, and Bugnug occasionally assists Freeman on assassination missions.

Kumagaism

Leader of the  cult. He has professional wrestler Oshu Tohgoku abduct Freeman to clone him to make the 108 Dragons part of his cult and arm them with 1,000 Type 100 submachine guns to take over Japan. Kumaga also has Kimie seduce Freeman for his clone to learn more about him. Little does Kumaga know that Kimie allows Freeman to switch places with his clone, letting Freeman play along with Kumaga's scheme until he traps Kumaga in the 108 Dragons' headquarters. Kumaga recites the "curse of the bear" chant to immobilize Freeman, but he is decapitated by Emu and the Muramasa.

A championship pro wrestler, Oshu is a massive, powerful man, standing over two meters tall. It is implied that Oshu secretly assists the Hakushin Society with its killings, and fights with a large dagger designed in the sword breaker style. Oshu is also a member of Kumagaism, and is instrumental in Kumaga's plot to kidnap Freeman to clone him, nearly killing Bugnug after capturing and raping her. During Freeman's captivity, he comes to develop respect for him, and does not reveal that Freeman had successfully converted Kimie to his side and was posing as the Freeman clone. In a death match with Freeman, his superior size and strength are defeated by Freeman's agility. After Bugnug hits him with a thrown knife as the coup de grâce, Oshu asks that the 108 Dragons adopt his family before committing suicide.

Kidnappers Organization (K.O.)

She first learned about Freeman a few years ago during one of his earlier assassinations at a hotel, where she worked as a receptionist and took photos of him during the hit. Ever since that day, she has been sexually obsessed with Freeman. Ten years later, Nina uses the K.O. to lure him in by kidnapping a prominent family in Los Angeles' Chinatown. She succeeds in capturing Freeman, but she is unable to have sex with him due to his lack of interest in her. Meanwhile, Emu leads a mission to rescue her husband and the hostages, as well as to wipe out K.O. for its audacity to attack the 108 Dragons. Nina is killed in the aftermath of this incident. (Note: In the manga, Nina is decapitated by a grenade during the assault. In the anime, Nina attempts to shoot Freeman, but he stabs her in the heart before throwing her off a cliff.)

A large, muscular, American ex-soldier with a tattoo of the Japanese deity, Kishimojin, on his back who serves as the leader of the ex-Green Berets in the Kidnappers Organization. During his tour of duty in the Vietnam War, he was somehow rendered impotent. Within K.O., Larry has found a purpose in life to create a place where people like himself can belong to - a country for soldiers. Larry is pitted against Freeman in a duel to the death by Nina and is eventually slain by the assassin.

Lucky Boyd

A member of the Kidnappers Organization. He is killed by Bái-Yá Shàn during the 108 Dragons' assault on K.O.'s island.

Others
Boss Wong

Leader of the Wong family, which has controlled Chinatown in Los Angeles for over 60 years. When the Kidnappers Organization abducts his first daughter and her family, Wong calls Freeman to rescue them.

Wonshaku

The second daughter of Boss Wong. Wonshaku works for The Pentagon in the computer strategy division. Because of this, she is called upon by Wong to assist Freeman in learning more about the Kidnappers Organization. Wonshaku is wounded in an ambush staged by the K.O.; this attack reveals the fact that the K.O.'s true target is Freeman. While Freeman is captured by the K.O., Wonshaku plants a virus in the K.O.'s mainframe before flying to their island to infiltrate their base and recover her sister's family, but her cover is blown when her niece Woh Pei recognizes her.

A young wakagashira (underboss) of a Yakuza group, Tsunaike harbors ambitions to eventually become the leader of all crime syndicates of Asia. His plan to do this involves igniting a gang war between the Yakuza and the 108 Dragons, then taking over their operations with the help of his contacts in the Russian Connection, a Russian mafia. Tsunaike is assisted in his efforts by Tanya, a beautiful Russian assassin who is also his lover. Attacking both Yakuza and members of the 108 Dragons, Tsunaike gradually becomes bolder and eventually sets a trap for Freeman. However, he and Tanya severely underestimate Freeman's abilities as an assassin, and both are killed.

Tanya

A beautiful Russian woman with short, bobbed hair and pale skin, Tanya is a highly skilled assassin affiliated with the Russian Connection. Originally sent to aid Tsunaike in his efforts to take over the Yakuza operations in Japan, Tanya eventually becomes Tsunaike's lover and faithful follower. She takes part in several missions to eliminate high-level Yakuza and 108 Dragons leaders on Tsunaike's behalf. When Tsunaike sets a trap to kill Freeman, Tanya challenges the assassin to a duel and is killed.

Tateoka ambushes Freeman with his bladed getas laced with poison. Despite being wounded and poisoned, Freeman kills Tateoka by shoving his head under a light post.

Media

Manga
The manga was published in nine volumes, from 29 March 1986 to 1988 (Weekly Big Comic Spirits 1986 #7 to 1988 #21).

Original video animation

The manga was adapted into a six-part anime OVA series by Toei Animation that was released from September 1988 to January 1994.

The first five episodes of the Crying Freeman OVA were dubbed in English by Streamline Pictures and released on VHS from January 1994 to February 1995. Following the demise of Streamline Pictures, the series was re-released on DVD by A.D. Vision in 2003. The Complete Collection boxed set, released on January 27, 2004, includes episode 6, which features a new English dub featuring the original Streamline cast. Discotek Media reissued the Complete Collection boxed set on February 22, 2011.

References

External links
 

ADV Films
Dark Horse Comics titles
Discotek Media
Fictional assassins in comics
Kazuo Koike
Manga adapted into films
Ryoichi Ikegami
Seinen manga
Shogakukan manga
Triad (organized crime)
Toei Animation original video animation
Viz Media manga
Yakuza in anime and manga